Vannathirai  (VTV) is a 24-hour Tamil movie channel that includes live talks with hosts and Singaporean celebrities. Launched on 24 September 2008 and broadcast in Singapore through cable television,  it is suitable for all age groups as it screens films from the 1960s to the latest releases in 2019.

As a popular Tamil media, the channel is known among Singaporeans for broadcasting various classic hit movies and blockbusters.

Programmes
 Hello V Live
 Kalyana Mela
 Neengal Kettavai 
 Start Camera Action

External links
 Facebook page

References

Television stations in Singapore
Television channels and stations established in 2008
Tamil-language television shows